Alcachofa is the first studio album released by Chilean-German producer Ricardo Villalobos on the German house label Playhouse on September 19, 2003. The album cemented Villalobos' place in the vanguards of microhouse and minimal techno.

The vinyl edition contains an alternative track listing, as "What You Say Is More Than I Can Say" was already released in its full version on the EP Halma. "La Raja", "Quizás" and "Fusion the Enemies" remain exclusive to vinyl, while CD cuts "Waiworinao" and "Fools Garden" were later released on vinyl as part of the EP Alcachofa Tools. "Y.G.H." remains exclusive to the CD pressing.

In 2015, Villalobos would re-issue "Easy Lee" and "Dexter" on his Sei Es Drum label as a 12" vinyl.

Critical reception

Andy Kellman of AllMusic commented that Villalobos "is in complete control of his machines at all times, and he makes them do strange things that no one else can."

New York placed Alcachofa at #6 on the Top Albums of the 2003. Pitchfork placed Alcachofa at #165 on The Top 200 Albums of the 2000s. Resident Advisor voted Alcachofa at #1 on the Top 100 Albums of the 2000s. Stylus Decade placed Alachofa at #73 on the Top Albums of the 2000s.

Track listing
CD pressing

Vinyl pressing
On vinyl, sides A, B, D and F are at 45 RPM, while sides C and E play at 33⅓ RPM.

Personnel
 Artwork (Cover) – Saskia
 Writer, Producer – Ricardo Villalobos

Source:

References

2003 debut albums
Ricardo Villalobos albums